The Disney Worldwide Outreach Program is the Walt Disney Company's charitable division, helping charitable organizations throughout the world, as well as local initiatives.

History
In 1983 at Disneyland, Disney formed the "Disneyland Community Action Team" (DCAT).  DCAT became involved with the Special Olympics, the Orangewood Children's Home, and other local charities.  The corporate-wide VoluntEARS program was created from this initiative in 1992.  The DisneyHand program, soon to be renamed the Disney Worldwide Outreach program, was created to give a corporate standard on Disney's charitable initiatives.

National partners
Make-A-Wish Foundation
Starlight Starbright Children's Foundation
Toys for Tots
First Book
Boys & Girls Clubs of America

Programs
Disney Teacher Awards 
VoluntEARS

References

External links
Disney Global Outreach official website - with list of projects being worked on
Walt Disney World's official public affairs website - with info on community involvement, charitable support, and more

The Walt Disney Company